Cotova is a commune in Drochia District, Moldova. It is composed of two villages, Cotova and Măcăreuca. At the 2004 census, the commune had 3,569 inhabitants.

References

Communes of Drochia District